Mountville is a borough in Lancaster County, Pennsylvania, United States. The population was 3,022 at the 2020 census, up from 2,802 at the 2010 census. The original Charles Chips potato chip factory was located here.

Geography
Mountville is located in western Lancaster County at  (40.039797, -76.432433). U.S. Route 30, a four-lane freeway, passes through the northern part of the borough, with access from College Avenue at the northeast edge of town. US 30 leads east  to the northern part of Lancaster, the county seat, and west  to York. Pennsylvania Route 462 runs through the center of Mountville as Columbia Avenue; it leads east  to the center of Lancaster and west  to Columbia.

The east side of Mountville is drained by the West Branch of Little Conestoga Creek, a south-flowing tributary of the Conestoga River and part of the Susquehanna River watershed. The west side of the borough is drained by Strickler Run, a west-flowing direct tributary of the Susquehanna.

Demographics

As of the census of 2000, there were 2,444 people, 1,018 households, and 692 families residing in the borough. The population density was 2,856.8 people per square mile (1,097.2/km2). There were 1,041 housing units at an average density of 1,216.8 per square mile (467.4/km2). The racial makeup of the borough was 95.2% White, 1.3% African American, 0.0% Native American, 1.0% Asian, 1.3% from other races, and 1.1% from two or more races. Hispanic or Latino of any race were 2.7% of the population.

There were 1,018 households, out of which 28.9% had children under the age of 18 living with them, 52.1% were married couples living together, 12.4% had a female householder with no husband present, and 32.0% were non-families. 26.6% of all households were made up of individuals, and 7.5% had someone living alone who was 65 years of age or older. The average household size was 2.31 and the average family size was 2.76.

In the borough the population was spread out, with 20.9% under the age of 18, 8.4% from 18 to 24, 29.5% from 25 to 44, 25.5% from 45 to 64, and 15.7% who were 65 years of age or older. The median age was 40 years. For every 100 females there were 91.1 males. For every 100 females age 18 and over, there were 87.5 males.

The median income for a household in the borough was $10,000, and the median income for a family was $20,928. Males had a median income of $9,021 versus $11,978 for females. The per capita income for the borough was $22,010. About 4.6% of families and 7.2% of the population were below the poverty line, including 12.8% of those under age 18 and 2.0% of those age 65 or over. Also, the borough has an unemployment rate of 4.6%.

Services
Mountville is served by the West Hempfield Township Police, has one volunteer fire department, and is in the Hempfield School District.

History

On January 11, 1814, Isaac Rohrer laid out the town that became known as Mountville, dividing it into 130 building lots, sold by lottery.

In 1842, when the first post office was established in the town, the name was changed to "Mountville" because the postal service already had another Mount Pleasant registered in Pennsylvania.

Recognizing the need for a municipal water system, the town incorporated as a borough in 1906.

After several annexations of land adjoining the borough through the years since, Mountville now consists of just under one square mile of residential, commercial, industrial and public property. Mountville boasts one of the highest ratios of public park space per capita. With slightly more than 2,800 residents, the borough is served by the West Hempfield Township Police Department, protected by the Mountville Volunteer Fire Company, and educated by the Hempfield School District.

Notable Things in Town 
Field of Screams (amusement park) and Corn Cob Acres are popular attractions located in town. Founded in 1993 by brothers Gene and Jim Schopf. Field of Screams is best known for its wide range of horror “theme-park” attractions and branded events such as the Extreme Blackout, Zombie Fun Run, and Friday the 13th. Located just off the Mountville exit of Route 30, Field of Screams and Corn Cob Acres operates the months of September, October, and November. 

Other notable attractions include 

-Scoops Ice Cream & Grille and Boulders Miniature Golf. Located the opposite side of the highway from Field of Screams. Scoops Ice Cream and Grille offers both lunch and dinner, as well as a full ice cream parlor. 

- Froelich Park and Mountville Community Pool. Edward Froelich lived his entire life in Mountville Pennsylvania. He worked as a tobacco business man and owned several farms in the area. He was described by the a community as a respected, compassionate, and often reserved man. Following his death at the age of 82 Froelich donated his entire estate, totally around 3.5 million dollars to be split evenly between three organizations. The Mountville Welfare Association, the Salvation Army, and the Water Street Rescue Mission. To determine what to do with the money. Froeilch Park was constructed including the current softball and football fields. The community later voted for the construction of the Mountville Pool.

References

External links

Populated places established in 1814
Boroughs in Lancaster County, Pennsylvania
1814 establishments in Pennsylvania